Ghanem Haddaf (Arabic:غانم هداف) (born 27 September 1991) is a Qatari footballer. He currently plays for Al-Sailiya.

Honours

Club
Al-Sailiya SC
 Qatar FA Cup: 2021
 Qatari Stars Cup: 2020-21

External links
 

Qatari footballers
1991 births
Living people
Al-Sailiya SC players
Qatar Stars League players
Association football defenders